Óscar Vargas may refer to:

 Óscar Vargas (cyclist) (born 1964), retired road racing cyclist from Colombia
 Óscar Vargas (footballer) (born 1980), Honduran former footballer